Gibbobruchus is a genus of pea and bean weevils in the family Chrysomelidae. There are about seven described species in Gibbobruchus.

Species
These seven species belong to the genus Gibbobruchus:
 Gibbobruchus bergamini Manfio & Ribeiro-Costa, 2014 g
 Gibbobruchus cavillator Fahraeus, 1839 g
 Gibbobruchus cristicollis (Sharp, 1885) i c g
 Gibbobruchus divaricatae Whitehead and Kingsolver, 1975 i c g
 Gibbobruchus mimus (Say, 1831) i c g b (redbud bruchid)
 Gibbobruchus polycoccus Fahraeus, 1839 g
 Gibbobruchus scurra Boheman, 1833 g
Data sources: i = ITIS, c = Catalogue of Life, g = GBIF, b = Bugguide.net

References

Further reading

External links

 

Bruchinae
Articles created by Qbugbot
Chrysomelidae genera